Manganese(II) hydroxide is the inorganic compound with the formula Mn(OH)2. It is a white solid although samples darken quickly upon exposure to air owing to oxidation. It is poorly soluble in water.

Preparation and reactions
Manganese(II) hydroxide precipitates as a solid when an alkali metal hydroxide is added to an aqueous solution of Mn2+ salt:
Mn2+  +  2 NaOH   →   Mn(OH)2  +  2 Na+

Manganese(II) hydroxide oxidises readily in air, as indicated by darkening of samples.

The compound adopts the brucite structure, as do several other metal dihydroxides.

References

Manganese(II) compounds
Hydroxides